Bayannuur, Bayannur, or Bayinnur (Mongolian: rich lake) may refer to:

Mongolia 
several Sums (districts) in different Aimags (provinces), Mongolia
 Bayannuur, Bayan-Ölgii
 Bayannuur, Bulgan
 Bayan Lake, a lake in Zavkhan Province

China 
 Bayannur, a prefecture-level city in Inner Mongolia
 , a town in Sonid Left Banner, Inner Mongolia
 , a sum (Township) in Horqin Right Middle Banner, Inner Mongolia
 , a Township in Otog Banner, Inner Mongolia